Ladakh Autonomous Hill Development Council, Kargil (LAHDC Kargil), is an Autonomous District Council that administers the Kargil District of Ladakh, India.

History
In October 1993, the central Government of India and the state Government of Jammu and Kashmir agreed to grant each district of Ladakh the status of Autonomous Hill Council. This agreement was given effect by the Ladakh Autonomous Hill Development Council Act, 1995. A hill council for Leh district was formed in 1995 and the council for Kargil district was formed in 2003.

Powers

The autonomous hill councils work with village panchayats to take decisions on economic development, healthcare, education, land use, taxation, and local governance which are further reviewed at the block headquarters in the presence of the chief executive councillor and executive councillors. The Ladakh Police continues to look after law and order while Administration of Ladakh looks after the judicial system, communications and the higher education in the districts.

Election Results

The council has thirty members of which 26 are directly elected and four are appointed to represent women and minority communities. The council is led by a Chief Executive Councillor, who leads an executive committee of five members.

Members of the Executive Council
Here is a list of the members of the legislative council.

See also
 Ladakh Autonomous Hill Development Council, Leh

References

External links
Ladakh Autonomous Hill Development Council, Kargil

Government of Ladakh
Autonomous regions of India
States and territories established in 2003
Kargil district
2003 establishments in Jammu and Kashmir